The Evening Star is a 1979 role-playing game supplement for Traveller published by R. Warfield Game Design.

Contents
The Evening Star is a book and map set, a play aid for Traveller, about the Evening Star, a reinforced and hollowed out asteroid now given over to the enjoyment and pleasures of the galactic rich.

Reception
Tony Watson reviewed The Evening Star in The Space Gamer No. 34. Watson commented that "Despite the price, The Evening Star is a fine playing aid for use with Traveller, and should certainly provide some good material for any referee."

References

Role-playing game supplements introduced in 1979
Traveller (role-playing game) supplements